= James P. Kushner =

American hematologist

James P. Kushner is an American hematologist, currently Distinguished Professor Emeritus at University of Utah.
